(known as Street Fight in Germany and the Benelux Union) is a shooter game developed by Seibu Kaihatsu that was originally released into arcades in 1986, by Taito in Japan and Europe and by Romstar in North America. The game has players taking on the mafia in 1931 New York City by gunning down mobsters one by one.

Versions of the game were released for the Family Computer (1987) and MSX (1988) as  Acclaim advertised a release for the Nintendo Entertainment System in Western regions, but the console version remained exclusive to Japan.

Seibu Kaihatsu eventually released a follow-up game, Dead Angle.

Gameplay

The game is set in 1931 New York City where the player controls a young FBI agent who is out to avenge his family members, who were killed in a gang shootout. Over a period of several months, he targets mobsters, culminating with the mafia boss.

Players use a joystick to move a crosshair around the screen to aim and shoot at mobsters one at a time. They lurk around various areas, including on the street and in windows. An arrow appears that helps direct players to the location of the next mobster onscreen. Players have a set amount of time to find and shoot each enemy; if time is running out, a speech bubble appears counting down the last few seconds on the timer. When the timer reaches zero, the player is shot and the screen pans to the location of the enemy. A defend button is available as a last resort to avoid being shot. Players can replenish their ammo by shooting hidden ammunition boxes and get bonus points by shooting at gold bars.

Levels are cleared after a set number of mobsters are eliminated. In the game's final level, the player has only one opportunity to assassinate the mob boss as he walks in front of windows in a building. After the final level is completed, the game loops back to the beginning.

The Famicom version is largely the same. The player's progress can be restored any time in the Famicom version by using a password system of four numbers and/or letters.

Reception
In Japan, Game Machine listed Empire City: 1931 on their August 1, 1986 issue as being the fourth most-successful table arcade unit of the month.

A review by Clare Edgeley in Computer and Video Games said the game was "fast moving, with lots of action" and called it an "unusual and addictive game" that was  "bound to be a winner".

Notes

References

External links

1986 video games
Arcade video games
MSX games
Multiplayer and single-player video games
Nintendo Entertainment System games
Nintendo Switch games
Organized crime video games
PlayStation 4 games
Romstar games
Seibu Kaihatsu games
Shoot 'em ups
Taito arcade games
Video games about police officers
Video games set in 1931
Video games set in New York City
Video games developed in Japan
Hamster Corporation games